Bowen Terrace is a heritage-listed series of terrace houses located at 3-25 Bathurst Road, Orange, City of Orange, New South Wales, Australia. It was designed by John Hale. The property is privately owned. It was added to the New South Wales State Heritage Register on 2 April 1999.

History 
Bowen Terrace stands on part of  granted to Joseph Moulder in 1836. In 1875 Henry Thomas Bowen purchased  from Moulder and in 1876 he constructed Bowen Terrace. Bowen Terraces was designed by the town's Architect John Hale who also designed his home, Glenroi House, built at the same time. William Hawke purchased the Terrace from Bowen (date unknown) and the father of the present owner purchased the property in 1924.

It is a two-storey terrace building constructed of stuccoed brick with a continuous roof covered with corrugated iron. The balconies and columns are of cast iron. The Terrace was restored in 1968-72, the builder being Mr B. Tate.

Description 

A row of twelve Victorian Italianate terraces with encompassing hip ended long gable roof of rendered brick. Party walls extended to upper verandah roof only. Curved verandah roof supported on flat cast iron columns with cast iron trim and balustrade on both levels. Two pairs of french doors per dwelling on upper floor. Solid panelled timber entrance door (with low arch and transon light). The name and construction date of 1876 is on the central decorative parapet.

At the present time they are painted a dark chocolate with white trim.

Condition 

As at 13 August 1997, the physical condition was fair to good. Research needs to be done into the colour scheme.

Heritage listing 
Bowen Terrace was listed on the New South Wales State Heritage Register on 2 April 1999.

See also 

Australian residential architectural styles

References

Bibliography

Attribution 

New South Wales State Heritage Register
City of Orange
Houses in New South Wales
Articles incorporating text from the New South Wales State Heritage Register
1876 establishments in Australia
Buildings and structures completed in 1876